Tooban, also known as Tievebane and in Irish as Taobh Bán, is a townland in County Donegal in the north west of Ireland. It is traversed by the R238 road. Faghan Presbyterian church is situated near the centre of the townland.

It was served by Tooban Junction railway station from 1864 to 1953.

Tooban (listed in census reports as Tievebane) had a population of 345 people as of the 2016 census.

Further reading
Reports from Commissioners. Great Britain. Parliament. House of Commons. 1863. p. 59.
Wilkinson, S. B. (1908).  The Geology of the Country Around Londonderry. H.M. Stationery Office. p. 92.

References

Geography of County Donegal
Townlands of County Donegal